According to the Native Administration Act, 1927 (Act No. 38 of 1927; subsequently renamed the Bantu Administration Act, 1927 and the Black Administration Act, 1927), the Governor-General of South Africa could "banish" a 'native' or 'tribe' from one area to another whenever he deemed this 'expedient or in the general public interest'.

This Act set up a separate legal system for the administration of African law and made the proclaimed Black areas subject to a separate political regime from the remainder of the country, ultimately subject only to rule by proclamation, not parliament.

The central imperative behind the Act was to establish a strong enough system of national 'native administration' to contain the political pressures that were likely to result from the legislative measures necessary for the implementation of territorial segregation. It was, together with the Native Affairs Act, 1920, part of a process of transferring power over the regulation of African life from Parliament to the executive.

Moreover, it included a clause which stated: "Any person who utters any words or does any other act or thing whatever with intent to promote any feeling of hostility between Natives and Europeans, shall be guilty of an offence and liable on conviction to imprisonment not exceeding one year or to a fine of one hundred pounds or both", thus it became popularly known as the "hostility law".

Repeal
Many provisions of the act became unconstitutional on the introduction of the Interim Constitution of South Africa on 27 April 1994, which invalidated all laws which unfairly discriminated on the basis of race. The remaining provisions of the act have been repealed, or will be repealed on a future date, by the Repeal of the Black Administration Act and Amendment of Certain Laws Act, 2005.

See also
 :Category:Apartheid laws in South Africa
 Apartheid in South Africa

References

External links
 African History: Apartheid Legislation in South Africa
 Remaining provisions of the act presently in force

Apartheid laws in South Africa
1927 in South African law
Censorship in South Africa